Xu Zheng is the name of:

Xu Zheng (Eastern Wu) ( 3rd century), Eastern Wu official and author of the Three Five Historic Records
Xu Zheng (actor) (born 1972), Chinese actor and filmmaker
Xu Zheng (baseball) (born 1981), Chinese baseball player